San Genís de Bellera is a ruined Benedictine monastery in Senterada, Pallars Jussà, Catalonia, Spain.

History
It was founded by abbot Vulgarà in the mid-9th century. The monastery was protected by donations from the counts of Pallars, despite which in the 11th-12th centuries, it began to decline.

External links
 San Genís de Bellera - Monestirs de Catalunya 

Benedictine monasteries in Catalonia